Adhikar is a 1954 Hindi romantic comedy film starring Kishore Kumar and Usha Kiran in lead roles. It was seventh highest-grossing film of the year 1954. Usha Kiran was credited earlier in film credits than Kishore Kumar in this film.

Cast
 Kishore Kumar as Shekhar
 Usha Kiran as Usha
 Yashodra Katju 
 Niroo 
 Bhushan

Soundtrack
Lyrics were written by Prem Dhawan, Nilkant Tiwari, Deepak and Raja Mehdi Ali Khan.

References

External links
 

1954 films
1950s Hindi-language films
Films scored by Avinash Vyas
Hindi-language comedy films
Indian romantic comedy films
1954 romantic comedy films
Indian black-and-white films